KACG (100.3 FM) is a radio station licensed to serve the community of Goldfield, Nevada. The station is owned by Smith and Fitzgerald, Partnership, and airs a country music format.

The station was assigned the KACG call letters by the Federal Communications Commission on August 18, 2014.

References

External links
 Official Website
 FCC Public Inspection File for KACG
 

ACG
Radio stations established in 2014
2014 establishments in Nevada
Country radio stations in the United States
Esmeralda County, Nevada